Alex dos Santos Cazumba, usually known as Alex Cazumba, Alequito or Alex (born June 30, 1988) is a Brazilian footballer currently playing for Operário Ferroviário on loan from Bahia de Feira.

Career
Alex Cazumba played for the São Paulo youth teams before being promoted into the senior team in 2007. He was loaned out to several Brazilian regional over the next couple of years, making first team appearances for Juventude and Figueirense.

He was sent out on loan to Major League Soccer team Los Angeles Galaxy in 2010 along with fellow Brazilians from the club Leonardo and Juninho.

He made his debut for the team on March 27, 2010, in Galaxy's opening game of the 2010 MLS season against New England Revolution.

His first MLS goal came on June 5, 2010 in a 4-1 defeat of the Houston Dynamo.

Honors
São Paulo
 Campeonato Brasileiro Série A (1): 2008

 Los Angeles Galaxy
 Major League Soccer Supporter's Shield (1): 2010

Botafogo da Paraíba
 Campeonato Paraibano (1): 2014

References

External links
 globoesporte.globo.com
 CBF
 zerozero.pt
 MLS player profile

1988 births
Living people
Brazilian expatriate footballers
Brazilian expatriate sportspeople in the United States
Brazilian footballers
Expatriate soccer players in the United States
Expatriate footballers in Greece
Campeonato Brasileiro Série A players
Campeonato Brasileiro Série C players
Campeonato Brasileiro Série D players
Major League Soccer players
Super League Greece players
São Paulo FC players
Rio Claro Futebol Clube players
Esporte Clube Juventude players
Toledo Esporte Clube players
Vila Nova Futebol Clube players
Ituano FC players
Botafogo Futebol Clube (SP) players
Esporte Clube XV de Novembro (Piracicaba) players
Associação Ferroviária de Esportes players
Xanthi F.C. players
Operário Ferroviário Esporte Clube players
Clube Náutico Marcílio Dias players
Esporte Clube Vitória players
Associação Desportiva Bahia de Feira players
Botafogo Futebol Clube (PB) players
América Futebol Clube (RN) players
Nacional Futebol Clube players
Esporte Clube Passo Fundo players
Mogi Mirim Esporte Clube players
Association football fullbacks